Chauliodes pectinicornis known as Summer fishfly, is a species of fishfly from North America.

Distribution
C. pectinicornis has a wide distribution in the eastern Canada and United States, from Maine in the north-east to Alachua, Liberty and Santa Rosa counties in Florida to the south-east, and as far west as Kansas.

Taxonomic history
C. pectinicornis was first described by Carl Linnaeus in his 1763 work Centuria Insectorum.

Synonyms: Linnaeus 1763

Hemerobius pectinicornis, Hemerobius virginiensis, Semblis pectinicornis, Chauliodes virginiensis.

Ecology
C. pectinicornis has a commensal relationship with Plecoptcracoluthus downesi larvae, which undergo their entire life cycle including pupation on the fishfly's mesothorax.

References

External links
Chauliodes pectinicornis, American Insects

Corydalidae
Insects of North America
Insects described in 1763
Taxa named by Carl Linnaeus
Aquatic insects